Maxime Moisy (born 13 October 1992) is a French professional footballer who plays as a midfielder for Régional 1 club Mâcon.

Career
On 17 June 2019, Moisy officially joined Monts d'Or Azergues. He signed for Mâcon in July 2020.

Career statistics

References

Living people
1992 births
Association football midfielders
Sportspeople from Landes (department)
French footballers
Ligue 2 players
Championnat National players
Championnat National 2 players
Régional 1 players
Football Bourg-en-Bresse Péronnas 01 players
Jura Sud Foot players
GOAL FC players
UF Mâconnais players
Footballers from Nouvelle-Aquitaine